Patrick Moriarty may refer to:
 Patrick Moriarty, Jr. (1851–1928), mayor of the City of Ashland, Kentucky
 Patrick E. Moriarty (1805–1875), Irish born priest
Pat Moriarty (American football) (born 1955), football executive for the Baltimore Ravens in the National Football League
 Paddy Moriarty, Gaelic football player from Armagh, Northern Ireland
 Paddy Moriarty, resident of Larrimah, Northern Territory who disappeared in 2018